Ctenoplusia vittata, commonly known as the streaked plusia, is a moth of the family Noctuidae. It is found in Africa (south of the Sahara), the Arabian Peninsula, Madagascar, Saint Helena, Tripolitania, the Near East and West Pakistan.

In Réunion is found the sub-species: Ctenoplusia vittata borbonica [Guillermet, 2006)

The wingspan is about 37 mm.

The larvae feed on Solanum crinitum, Erigeron albidus, Solanum mauritianum (Solanaceae) and Erigeron albidus  (Asteraceae).

References

Plusiinae
Moths described in 1856
Moths of Asia
Moths of Cape Verde
Owlet moths of Africa
Moths of Madagascar
Moths of Mauritius
Moths of the Middle East
Moths of Réunion